Dr Devious (10 March 1989 – 7 March 2018) was an Irish-bred and British-trained Thoroughbred race horse. In a career which lasted from May 1991 until November 1992, he ran fifteen times and won six races. He is most notable as the winner of the Derby in 1992. Dr Devious's other most significant wins came in the Dewhurst Stakes and the Irish Champion Stakes. He was the second horse, after Bold Arrangement in 1986, to run in both the Kentucky Derby and the Epsom Derby.

Background

Bred by Lyonstown Stud, near Cashel, County Tipperary, Dr Devious was sired by Ahonoora out of the mare Rose of Jericho, a daughter of two-time Prix de l'Arc de Triomphe winner Alleged. As a son of Ahonoora, he is a representative of the Byerley Turk sire line, unlike more than 95% of modern thoroughbreds, who descend directly from the Darley Arabian. Rose of Jericho was an unraced mare who also produced the Greenlands Stakes winner Archway. He was purchased by Italian businessman Luciano Gaucci, owner of the Allevamento White Star breeding and racing operation who had had great success in the late 1980s with the colt Tony Bin. Dr Devious, reportedly named after a supervillain, was trained throughout his career by Peter Chapple-Hyam.

Racing career

1991: two-year-old season
In the spring of 1991, the two-year-old Dr Devious won the May Maiden Stakes at Newbury, then in June ran second in the Coventry Stakes at Royal Ascot. Ridden for the remainder of the year by Willie Carson, in July he won the Superlative Stakes at Newmarket and in August the Vintage Stakes at Goodwood Racecourse. The horse had been sold by Robert Sangster to Luciano Gaucci before the Vintage Stakes, but the agreement was that he would be leased back to Sangster for his next two races.  Back at Newmarket, on 2 October he finished a head second to Young Senor in a crowded field in the Tiffany Highflyer Stakes then just over two weeks later (wearing the Gaucci colours for the first time) ran in the Group One seven furlong  Dewhurst Stakes, Britain's most prestigious race for two-year-olds. He took the lead a furlong from the finish and won by two and a half lengths from Great Palm.

1992: three-year-old season
American Jenny Craig purchased Dr Devious for a reported $2.5 million as a gift for her husband Sidney. In April 1992, Dr Devious finished second to Alnasr Alwasheek under the French-based American jockey Cash Asmussen in the Craven Stakes. In May of that year, the colt was shipped to Churchill Downs in Louisville, Kentucky, to compete in America's most prestigious horse race, the Kentucky Derby. Racing on dirt, Dr Devious finished seventh to winner Lil E. Tee. After the race, Sidney Craig asked the advice of his American trainer, Ron McAnally, who advised him that Dr Devious was a turf specialist and that he should send the colt back to England.

Dr Devious returned to England to run in the Epsom Derby on 3 June. Starting the 8/1 second favourite in a field of eighteen, he took the lead a furlong from the finish and held off the challenges of St Jovite and Silver Wisp to win by two lengths.

Three and a half weeks after his Epsom win, Dr Devious met St Jovite again in the Irish Derby at the Curragh. Dr Devious was made odds-on favourite but was never able to make a serious challenge to St Jovite, who won by twelve lengths in record time. Dr Devious finished fourth in the International Stakes at York in August and then ran against St Jovite for a third time in the Irish Champion Stakes over ten furlongs. The two horses raced head-to-head down the straight with Dr Devious moving ahead near the post and winning by a short head.

Dr Devious ran three more times without recovering his best form. He finished sixth in the Prix de l'Arc de Triomphe, fourth in the Breeders' Cup Turf, and unplaced on his final start in the Japan Cup.

Stud career

Retired to stud in Japan 1993-96 at Coolmore Ireland in 1997-2001, he was eventually sent to Italy for stud duty at Allevamenti della Berardenga in 2002-16, Pensioned from stud duties in 2016 and was the leading sire in Italy on two occasions. His most successful offspring has been the gelding Collier Hill, a multiple winner of major international stakes whose victories include the 2004 and 2006 Stockholm Cup International, the 2005 Gerling-Preis and Irish St. Leger Stakes, and the 2006 Canadian International Stakes and Hong Kong Vase. He was also the sire of the Prix de l'Opéra winner Kinnaird. Died in Sardinia on 7 March 2018.

Pedigree

References

External links
 Video at YouTube with pre Arc de Triomphe commentary and highlights of the three previous meetings between Dr Devious and St Jovite

1989 racehorse births
2018 racehorse deaths
Racehorses trained in the United Kingdom
Racehorses bred in Ireland
Thoroughbred family 1-t
Byerley Turk sire line
Epsom Derby winners